The Vrancea Mountains are a mountain range in the Curvature Carpathians in Romania. Located mostly in western Vrancea County, they also cover parts of Bacău, Buzău, and Covasna counties. 

The Vrancea Mountains are a habitat for a large number of animals, including brown bears, red foxes, deer, wild boars, Carpathian lynxes, stone martens, gray wolves,  wild cats, and hares, as well as birds such as capercaillies, warblers, vultures, golden eagles, lesser spotted eagles, eagle-owls, tawny owls, long-eared owls, ravens, ring ouzels, black woodpeckers, green woodpeckers, and jays.

The 1977 Vrancea earthquake had its epicentre in these mountains.

References 

Mountain ranges of Romania
Mountain ranges of the Eastern Carpathians
Important Bird Areas of Romania